Haridwar Lok Sabha constituency is one of the five Lok Sabha (parliamentary) constituencies in Uttarakhand. It comprises two districts namely Dehradun (part) and Haridwar. This constituency came into existence in 1977, following the delimitation of Lok Sabha constituencies. Between the period of 1977 and 2009, this constituency was reserved for the Scheduled Caste candidates.

Assembly segments

Before the formation of Uttarakhand

Haridwar Lok Sabha constituency comprised the following five Vidhan Sabha (legislative assembly) constituency segments of Uttar Pradesh:

After the formation of Uttarakhand

At present, Haridwar Lok Sabha constituency comprises the following fourteen Vidhan Sabha (legislative assembly) segments:

Members of Parliament

Election results

See also
 List of constituencies of the Lok Sabha
 List of parliamentary constituencies in Uttarakhand

References

External links
 Map of Assembly constituencies of Uttarakhand at Election Commission of India
 CEO of Uttrakhand - Govt. Official website
Hardwar lok sabha  constituency election 2019 date and schedule

Lok Sabha constituencies in Uttarakhand